{{Infobox character
| name = Brad Boimler
| series = Star Trek: Lower Decks
| franchise = Star Trek
| image = Bradward Boimler.png
| caption = 
| first = "Second Contact" (2020)Star Trek: Lower Decks| full_name = Bradward BoimlerWilliam Boimler (transporter clone)
| nickname = Brad
| creator = Mike McMahan
| lbl1 = Voiced by
| data1 = Jack Quaid
| lbl2 = Portrayed by
| data2 = Jack Quaid
| species = Human
| occupation = Starfleet officer
| gender = Male
| origin = Earth (Modesto, CA)
| title = Ensign
}}
Bradward Boimler is a fictional character from the American science fiction television series Star Trek: Lower Decks. He is known for being ambitious while diligently following the rules of the service, and pleading excessively for his best friend, Ensign Beckett Mariner, an openly insubordinate ensign who regularly skirts the consequences, to do the same. In the far future, Boimler is remembered for the Boimler Effect, a ship-wide mandate aboard the USS Cerritos encouraging breaking the rules. Boimler does not want to be known for this, thinking that people will believe he wasn't a rule-follower. Boimler is voiced by Jack Quaid, who will also reprise the role in a live-action crossover in the second season of Star Trek: Strange New Worlds.

 Characterization  

Boimler has been described as the kind of person who does "everything by the book" and "a total stickler." About the character, Quaid noted that Boimler would "nail the written portion of the driving test with flying colors but once it actually got to him being in the car, it would be a complete and total disaster." Quaid additionally called Boimler the direct opposite of friend Beckett Mariner. According to Variety, "while great at sci-fi stuff, he’s completely bound to the rules. He doesn’t know how to follow his gut, and if he wants to be a captain some day he’s going to have to learn how to improvise." Quaid also originally auditioned for the role of Sam Rutherford, but was cast as Boimler. Brad Boimler has also been likened to Quaid's character on the Amazon Prime Video original series The Boys, Hughie.

 Fictional biography 
 Season 1 

In the beginning of season one, Boimler is tasked with keeping his friend and co-worker Beckett Mariner in check by the USS Cerritos captain Carol Freeman, who, unbeknownst to him, is Mariner's mother. He sees his friend smuggling supplies to a pair of poor farmer down on a planet the Cerritos is making second contact to, and so he must decide to either follow the rules and report Mariner's behavior or break the rules like Mariner and do what's right. In the end, Boimler decides not to help Mariner but also not to report her.

For most of the rest of the season, Boimler tries to do both and impress the bridge crew while he's at it. However, though he and Mariner remain friends, he slowly starts to grow resentful of her constant rule breaking and that it always gets the job done anyway. In episode two, "Envoys", Boimler even considers quitting Starfleet when Mariner navigates a foreign planet much better than him, but Mariner hires an alien impostor and fakes a threat for Boimler to overcome, restoring some of his confidence. Over the rest of the season, the two develop an uneasy friendship, though Boimler remains determined to advance in Starfleet and tries to maintain a spotless record, despite getting embroiled in Mariner's antics.

In the season finale, "No Small Parts", Boimler tells Mariner he has learned she is Freeman's daughter, unwittingly broadcasting this to the crew and making the secret public. This upsets Mariner's relationship with the rest of the crew and with Boimler, but following a crisis that almost destroys the ship, Boimler embraces life in the lower decks with Mariner, declaring her his best friend. Shortly after, he seizes an opportunity for promotion that Mariner rejected and is reassigned to the USS Titan, serving on the bridge under the command of William Riker (from Star Trek: The Next Generation), leaving Mariner furious and ignoring her calls.

 Season 2 

In season two, Boimler is still an officer aboard the USS Titan under Captain Riker, although he finds the crew's dangerous missions trying. After an adventure with his crew mates on the Titan that allows him to truly realize what being in Starfleet is all about, Boimler is accidentally cloned in a transporter accident, and Riker sends the original back to the Cerritos, with the clone Boimler opting to stay and work on the Titan, taking the new forename William. Boimler is welcomed back with open arms, though Mariner remains a little resistant.

Despite this career setback and his personal foibles, Boimler's formative experiences soon assisted him in distinguishing himself on the Cerritos as an officer of considerable talent and command potential, such as dealing with a Ferengi Mugato poaching operation by presenting a persuasive counter-proposal to convert it into a legal wildlife preserve, and later outwitting a malevolent artificial intelligence. Furthermore, Boimler gained the attention of a clique of ambitious ensigns called The Redshirts who aspired to emulate notable Starfleet captains to accelerate promotion. Although Boimler impressed them emulating Captain Riker's inspirational oratory, he caused it to dissolve by his good example of his proper attitude as a Starfleet officer. This happened when he objected to their haughty dismissal of his friends and when he impressed the ship's senior command with an unorthodox solution concerning a comrade changed into a dangerous monster by publicly humiliating himself to amuse her enough to change back normal.

 Season 3 

Boimler is revealed to be of a family of raisin farmers, a family profession which he dislikes with such intensity that the fact that numerous comely female co-workers on that farm are continually propositioning him is of no interest. In addition, his career advances in subtle ways, such as when he was assigned with Mariner to a Starfleet recruitment booth at a local event, a task made more difficult being surrounded by other organizations that openly hold the officers in derisive contempt. When the abuse extends to having his uniform's rank pip to being dislodged and stepped on, Boimler goes into a violent tantrum in response, which inadvertently sparks considerable recruitment interest in a service that can inspire such confidence in their members. As a result, while Boimler is officially reprimanded for the incident and sent to the brig, his First Officer privately commends him for his defense of Starfleet.

 Reception 
Brad Boimler has been a generally well-received character. Author Jodi L. Milner reviewed the series, and in the article she noted that the character is "desperate to get into command to the point that he will literally do anything to gain attention." Alan Sepinwall, writing for Rolling Stone'', called Boimler "an easily flustered try-hard who doesn't understand why his rigorous rule following goes ignored by Captain Carol Freeman."

References 

Fictional characters from California
Male characters in animated series
Starfleet ensigns
Starfleet officers
Star Trek: Lower Decks
Star Trek characters
Television characters introduced in 2020
Television characters introduced in 2021